Katie M Grant (born 1958) is a children's writer, based in Scotland, who is best known for her DeGranville Trilogy, published by Walker Books.

Early and personal life
Born Katharine Mary Towneley, she is the third daughter of Sir Simon Towneley and Lady Mary Fitzherbert.  She grew up at Dyneley Hall in Cliviger near Burnley. She married William Marr Couper Grant the son of Douglas Marr Kelso Grant in 1985. They have three children together and live in Glasgow.

Published books

How The Hangman Lost His Heart
The DeGranville Trinity:
Blood Red Horse
Green Jasper
Blaze of Silver
Perfect Fire Trilogy:
Blue Flame
White Heat
Paradise Red
Other Published books:
Belle's Song

References

External links
Katharine Grant's website
Royal Literary Fund profile Royal Literary Fund Consultant Fellow
Encyclopedia.com entry
Interview at Thebookseller.com

Scottish children's writers
Writers from Glasgow
Living people
1958 births
English people of Belgian descent
English people of Dutch descent
Bertie family
Schuyler family